United Guadeloupe, Solidary and Responsible (abbreviated GUSR), formerly known as United Guadeloupe, Socialism and Facts, is a political party in the French overseas department of Guadeloupe. The party was founded by Dominique Larifla, a former socialist member of parliament and former president of the Department Council of Guadeloupe. The party is close to the Modern Left and used to have a Senator sitting in the European Democratic and Social Rally. The party has one seat in the French National Assembly, in the group of the Socialist Party. The party also has one seat in the Senate. The party was also formerly aligned with the Left Radical Party and is now aligned with La République En Marche !.

See also 
:Category:United Guadeloupe, Solidary and Responsible politicians

References

External links 
 

Political parties in Guadeloupe
Socialist parties in Guadeloupe
Political parties established in 1994